Karpasia ( Latinized as Carpasia, and also known as Karpasion (sometimes mistaken for Karpathos), was an ancient town in Cyprus, situated in the northern shore of the Karpas Peninsula, at a distance of 3 km from the modern town of Rizokarpaso. According to tradition, it was founded by the Phoenician king Pygmalion of Tyre. It had a harbour, whose moles remain visible to this day.

According to archaeological evidence, the earliest possible date for the foundation of the town is the 7th century BC. It was first mentioned in literature in 399 BC. The town was mentioned by the writers of antiquity, including Strabo. The city is also mentioned in the Hellenica Oxyrhynchia, which is papyrus fragments in Greek with the history of ancient Greece.
In 306 BC, the town was the site of landing for Demetrius I of Macedon, whose forces stormed Carpasia and the neighbouring town of Urania, before proceeding to Salamis.

The architectural style as well as the techniques used in building the stone houses of the town incorporated elements of Phoenician influence.

In the Delphic Theorodochoi inscription (230 BC), which was published by André Plassart, there is a mention of a Karpasian man who was named Aristostratos.

Its first known bishop, Philo, was ordained by Epiphanius of Salamis in the 4th century; he has left a commentary on the Song of Songs, a letter, and some fragments. Another bishop of the see, Hermolaus, was present at the Council of Chalcedon in 451. The chroniclers mention the names of three other bishops, and a fourth occurs on a seal, all without dates. Another is quoted in the "Constitutio Cypria" of Pope Alexander IV (1260). No longer a residential bishopric, Carpasia is today used by the Roman Catholic Church as a titular see.

References

Geography of Cyprus
Archaeological sites in Cyprus
Former populated places in Cyprus